It's All Good is the seventh studio album by American country music artist Joe Nichols, released on November 8, 2011 by Show Dog-Universal Music. It produced the top 30 single "Take It Off." Craig Morgan also recorded the track "This Ole Boy" for his album of the same name.

Track listing

Personnel
Tim Akers - accordion
Wyatt Beard - background vocals
Jim "Moose" Brown - Hammond B-3 organ
Pat Buchanan - electric guitar
Buddy Cannon - background vocals
Melonie Cannon - background vocals
Perry Coleman - background vocals
J.T. Corenflos - electric guitar
Tony Creasman - drums
Eric Darken - percussion
Dan Dugmore - steel guitar, lap steel guitar
Shannon Forrest - drums
Paul Franklin - steel guitar, lap steel guitar
Kevin "Swine" Grantt - bass guitar
Kenny Greenberg - electric guitar
Aubrey Haynie - fiddle
Wes Hightower - background vocals
Mike Johnson - steel guitar
Alison Krauss - background vocals
Paul Leim - drums
Randy McCormick - Hammond B-3 organ, Wurlitzer
Steve Nathan - keyboards, Hammond B-3 organ, synthesizer, Wurlitzer
Joe Nichols - lead vocals
Larry Paxton - bass guitar
Gary Prim - piano
Mickey Raphael - harmonica
Michael Rhodes - bass guitar
John Wesley Ryles - background vocals
Joe Spivey - fiddle
Russell Terrell - background vocals
Bobby Terry - acoustic guitar, electric guitar
Ilya Toshinsky - banjo, acoustic guitar, mandolin
Dan Tyminski - background vocals
Scott Vestal - banjo
Billy Joe Walker Jr. - acoustic guitar
Lonnie Wilson - drums

Charts

Album

Singles

ADid not enter the Hot 100 but charted on Bubbling Under Hot 100 Singles.

References

2011 albums
Joe Nichols albums
Show Dog-Universal Music albums
Albums produced by Buddy Cannon
Albums produced by Mark Wright (record producer)